The Sheikdom of Upper Asir was an Arab state which was established in August 1916, after it broke away from the Idrisid Emirate of Asir, possibly with Hejazi aid. It was led by Al-Hasan Bin Ayad. In 1920, Upper Asir faced tribal revolts and bin Ayad's reign was threatened. In April to May 1920, Ibn Saud of the Emirate of Nejd intervened in support of the tribesmen and defeated bin Ayad. Upper Asir was then partitioned between the Saudi and the Idrisi on 30 August 1920.

References

Former Arab states
Former monarchies of Asia
Ottoman Arabia
Former emirates
Successor states